Thomas Heighes (2 June 1825 – 29 December 1882) was an English first-class cricketer, active 1851–57, who played for Manchester Cricket Club and Lancashire. He was born in Selborne, Hampshire and died in Belfast, Ireland

External links

1825 births
1882 deaths
English cricketers
People from Selborne
Manchester Cricket Club cricketers